Hidayat Nur Wahid (born 8 April 1960 in Klaten, Central Java) was the Speaker of Indonesia People's Consultative Assembly (Majelis Permusyawaratan Rakyat/MPR) for the 2004–2009 period. He resigned as the leader of Prosperous Justice Party (Partai Keadilan Sejahtera/PKS) on 11 October 2004. Hidayat was mentioned in the media as a possible running mate for Susilo Bambang Yudhoyono in the 2009 Indonesian presidential election .

External links
Profile at tokohindonesia.com (in Indonesian)
Hidayat Nur Wahid's own site (in Indonesian)
Profile at mpr.go.id (in Indonesian)

  

1960 births
Living people
People from Klaten Regency
Speakers of the People's Consultative Assembly
Muslim Brotherhood leaders
Prosperous Justice Party politicians
Indonesian Muslims
International Union of Muslim Scholars members
Members of the People's Representative Council, 2014
Members of the People's Representative Council, 2019